Graham James Chidgey (born 5 January 1937) is a former English cricketer.  Chidgey was a right-handed batsman who bowled right-arm off break.  He was born at Lambeth, London.

Chidgey made his first-class debut for the Free Foresters against Cambridge University in 1962 at Fenner's, scoring a century with a score of 113 in the Free Foresters' second innings. He made a further first-class appearance for the team in that season against Oxford University at the University Parks, while two years later he made a third and final first-class appearance for the Free Foresters against Oxford University. In his three first-class appearances, Chidgey scored 164 runs at an average of 27.33. He also played second XI cricket for Surrey.

References

External links

1937 births
Living people
People from Lambeth
English cricketers
Free Foresters cricketers